Acta Mathematica may refer to several publications:
Acta Mathematica, published by the Royal Swedish Academy
Acta Mathematica Academiae Paedagogicae Nyíregyháziensis, published by the University of Nyíregyháza
Acta Mathematica Hungarica, published by Akadémiai Kiadó and Springer for the Hungarian Academy of Sciences
Acta Mathematica Scientia, published by Elsevier
Acta Mathematica Sinica, published by Springer 
Acta Mathematica Universitatis Comenianae published by the Comenius University
Acta Mathematica Universitatis Ostraviensis published by the University of Ostrava
Acta Mathematica Vietnamica, published by Springer 
Acta Mathematicae Applicatae Sinica, published by Springer